Kelvington can refer to:

Kelvington, Saskatchewan
Rural Municipality of Kelvington No. 366, Saskatchewan
Kelvington (electoral district), a former provincial electoral district in Saskatchewan